James S. Brown (1824–1878) was a mayor of Milwaukee, Wisconsin, and member of U.S. House of Representatives. 

James S. Brown may also refer to:

 James S. Brown Jr. (1892–1949), American cinematographer
 James Smedley Brown, 19th-century American educator of the deaf
 James Stephens Brown (–1947), mayor of Nashville, Tennessee
 James Stephens Brown (Mormon) (1828–1902), American mormon, participant of the California Gold Rush
 James Sutherland Brown (1881–1951), Canadian general and war planner